Liebe zu Böhmen (1972) is an autobiography of the interwar leading tennis player and late writer Roderich Menzel. He remembers not only about his tennis experiences, but also about his childhood, traveling around the world and important events that have affected his personal life.

In a first part of the book, Dieses schöne Land..., Menzel especially remembers his hometown Reichenberg, where he spent his childhood and began his successful career as a top sportsman. Describes the complicated coexistence of Czechs and Germans in the region, exploring the surroundings with his father, his first love, but also his father's early death. In the second part Zwischen Prag und Samoa Cairo... Menzel talks about his experiences on many trips around the world, where he met a lof of interesting people and saw many extraordinary things. The third and final part of the book Vor und nach der Sintflut is dedicated to the end of Menzel's active sports career, his personal life, situation during World War II and the beginnings of his writing career.

References
Roderich Menzel (1972). Liebe zu Böhmen. Sudpress Verlag München.

Travel books
1972 non-fiction books
German autobiographies